The nippled sea fan (Eunicella papillosa), is a species of gorgonian sea fan in the family Gorgoniidae.

Description
This fan is short and pale cream to orange in colour. It grows upright or in bushy masses, with irregular or frequent branches coming off the main basal stem. The branches are covered on all sides with many small bumps from which the polyps extend. It may grow up to 18 cm tall and have branches of 0.2 to 0.4 cm wide.

Distribution
This sea fan is found only around the southern African coast from Lüderitz to Sodwana Bay in 1–360 m of water.

Ecology
This sea fan usually grows in areas sheltered from strong current. It is preyed upon by the whip fan nudibranch, which strongly resembles the feeding fan.

References 

Gorgoniidae
Corals described in 1797